Heijmans N.V. is a major European construction-services business with Dutch-based headquarters.

History
The company was founded by Jan Heijmans in Rosmalen in 1923. It was first listed on the Amsterdam Stock Exchange in 1993.

Operations
The company has the following divisions:
Property development
Residential housing
Non-residential construction
Installation techniques
Infrastructure

Major projects
Major projects undertaken the company include ING House completed in 2002, the Western Scheldt Tunnel completed in 2003 and "The Blob" in Eindhoven completed in 2010.

References

External links
 

Construction and civil engineering companies established in 1923
Construction and civil engineering companies of the Netherlands
Dutch companies established in 1923